Brazil Downtown Historic District is a national historic district located at Brazil, Clay County, Indiana.  The district encompasses 35 contributing buildings and two contributing objects in the central business district of Brazil. The district developed between about 1875 and 1935, and includes notable examples of Italianate, Romanesque Revival, and Renaissance Revival style architecture.  Located in the district is the separately listed United States Post Office.  Other notable buildings include the Sinclair Oil Gas Station (c. 1935), Lark Theater (1922, 1958), Citizens Bank Building (c. 1910), Brazil Trust Company (c. 1915), D.H. Davis Building (1909), and Telephone Building (c. 1925).

It was added to the National Register of Historic Places in 1997.

References

Historic districts on the National Register of Historic Places in Indiana
Italianate architecture in Indiana
Romanesque Revival architecture in Indiana
Renaissance Revival architecture in Indiana
Historic districts in Clay County, Indiana
National Register of Historic Places in Clay County, Indiana